The 1928–29 season is FC Barcelona's 30th in existence, and was their first year in the Primera División, and covers the period from 1928-07-01 to 1929-06-30.

FC Barcelona won the first Liga title ever, and it was their only title of the year.

First-team squad

Competitions

La Liga

League table

Results by round

Matches

Copa del Rey

Round of 32

Round of 16

Quarterfinals

Semifinals

Catalan football championship

League table

Matches

Friendlies

Results

References
BDFutbol
LinguaSport
Webdelcule.com

FC Barcelona seasons
Barcelona
1929